Guildford is a town in Surrey, England. It gives its name to the Borough of Guildford, the Diocese of Guildford and the Parliamentary constituency of Guildford.

Guildford, Guilford, or Gildford may also refer to:

Places

Australia 
 Guildford, New South Wales, a suburb of Sydney
 Guildford, Tasmania
 Guildford, Victoria
 Guildford, Western Australia

Canada 
 Guildford, British Columbia, a neighbourhood in Surrey
 Guilford (railway point), British Columbia

United Kingdom 
 Guildford, a suburb of the town of Hayle in Cornwall

United States 
 Guilford, Connecticut
 Guilford, Illinois
 Guilford, Indiana
 Guilford, Maine, a New England town
 Guilford (CDP), Maine, the main village in the town
 Guilford, Maryland, in Howard County
 Guilford (Frederick, Maryland), a country farmhouse
 Guilford, Baltimore, Maryland, a neighborhood
 Gildford, Montana
 Guilford, New York
 Guilford County, North Carolina
 Guilford, Vermont
 Guilford (White Post, Virginia), listed on the NRHP in Clarke County, Virginia

Other uses 
 Guilford Press, an independent publisher based in New York
 Earl of Guilford and Baron Guilford, peerage titles
 Pan Am Systems or Guilford Transportation Industries, a railroad and airline holding company
 Guildford (1810 ship), a vessel that made eight voyages to transport convicts to Australia in the early 19th Century, and that disappeared with all her crew on her way home from her last delivery
 Guildford College, a 16 years - adult college in Guildford, Surrey, United Kingdom.

People
 J. P. Guilford (1897–1988), American psychologist
 Lord Guildford Dudley (1536–1554), husband of Lady Jane Grey
 Jane Guildford (1500s–1555), Duchess of Northumberland, mother of Lord Guilford Dudley
 Paul Willis Guilford (1876-1956), American lawyer, judge, and politician
 Zac Guildford (born 1989), New Zealand rugby player

See also 
 Guildford Four, four Irish people wrongly convicted of the 1974 Guildford pub bombings
 Guilford Street in Bloomsbury, London
 Battle of Guilford Court House, a battle fought in 1781 in Greensboro, North Carolina, USA
 Guilford Courthouse National Military Park, a site maintained by the US National Park Service commemorating the battle
 Guilford College, a college in Greensboro, North Carolina, United States 
 Guilford Technical Community College, a college in Guilford County, North Carolina
 Gilford (disambiguation)